Team Northumbria are a basketball club based in the north-east of England, which plays their home games at Northumbria University's £30million Sport Central complex.  The club is operated by Northumbria University in partnership with the nearby professional Newcastle Eagles team, and currently enters Men's and Women's teams in the respective top flights of the English Basketball League, as well as multiple teams in the BUSA Basketball League.

Franchise history

Team Northumbria entered competition in the English Basketball League in 2000, with the Men's team entering Division Three (North) and the Women's team entering Division Two (North), the respective bottom tiers for the region.  After a few years adjusting to the level of National League competition, the Men's team started to find success in the 2005/2006 season, when they won the National Shield for the first time, and also claimed second place in the league, earning them promotion to Division Two.  2006/2007 saw them defend their National Shield title, while the following two years brought successive runner-up places in the end-of-season playoffs.  It would take until the 2011/2012 season for the Men's team to finally reach Division One, earning promotion with a double success in winning the league title and end-of-season playoffs.

Coincidentally, the Women's team won their first promotion in the 2005/2006 season as well, claiming the triple of the Division Two title, play-off crown and National Shield, launching the team into the Women's top flight after only a few short years.  The Women's team have remained in the top flight of English Women's basketball ever since, with a third place in 2007/2008 their best finish to date.

References

External links
BUCS Basketball Site
Official Team Northumbria Twitter

Basketball teams established in 2000
Basketball teams in England
Basketball
University and college sports clubs in England
2000 establishments in England